The 1976 Ice Hockey World Championships were the 43rd Ice Hockey World Championships and the 54th European Championships in ice hockey. The tournament took place in Poland from 8 to 25 April, and the games were played in Katowice. Eight teams took part in the main tournament, with each team first playing each other once. The four best teams then took part in a medal play off, and the teams placed 5–8 took part in a relegation play-off. The teams took the results from the first round through to the second round with them.

In response to charges of the rules regarding amateurism being unfair a change was implemented for this year. The 1976 IHWC tournament was first to feature major league professionals from the NHL and WHA, although in the end only the United States made use of the new rule, recalling eight pros from the Minnesota North Stars and Minnesota Fighting Saints. Some nations, such as the Soviet Union, had been using pros all along, while circumventing their status by listing them in the military. The Americans promptly made the medal play off for the first time since 1962 after beating Sweden and tying Finland in the first round.

The Czechoslovakia national ice hockey team won nine games and were unbeaten, becoming world champions for the fourth time. The defending champions from the USSR finished 2nd after sensationally losing the opening game 4–6 to hosts Poland. Sweden won the bronze after beating the Americans 7-3 in the medal round. In the European standings Sweden moved up one position leaving the Soviets with the bronze for the first time ever.

World Championship Group A (Poland)

First round

Final Round 1–4 place

Consolation Round 5–8 place 

East Germany was relegated to Group B.  Poland was also relegated to make room for the return of team Canada.

World Championship Group B (Switzerland)
Played in Aarau and Bienne 18–27 March.

Romania was promoted to Group A, and both Italy and Bulgaria were relegated to Group C.

World Championship Group C (Poland)
Played in Gdańsk 8–13 March.

Both Austria and Hungary were promoted to Group B.

Ranking and statistics

Tournament Awards
Best players selected by the directorate:
Best Goaltender:       Jiří Holeček
Best Defenceman:       František Pospíšil
Best Forward:          Vladimír Martinec
Media All-Star Team:
Goaltender:  Jiří Holeček
Defence:  František Pospíšil,  Mats Waltin
Forwards:  Valeri Kharlamov,  Vladimír Martinec,  Milan Nový

Final standings
The final standings of the tournament according to IIHF:

European championships final standings
The final standings of the European championships according to IIHF:

References

Complete results

IIHF Men's World Ice Hockey Championships
I
1976
Sports competitions in Katowice
Ice Hockey World Championships
20th century in Katowice
International ice hockey competitions hosted by Switzerland
Ice Hockey World Championships
Aarau
World Championships
Sports competitions in Gdańsk
20th century in Gdańsk